"Drive" is a song by American rock band the Cars from their fifth studio album, Heartbeat City (1984). It was released on July 23, 1984, as the album's third single. Written by Ric Ocasek, the track was sung by bassist Benjamin Orr and produced by Robert John "Mutt" Lange with the band. Upon its release, "Drive" became the Cars' highest-charting single in most territories. In the United States, it peaked at number three on the Billboard Hot 100 and topped the Adult Contemporary chart. It reached number five (number four on re-entry in 1985) in the United Kingdom, number four in West Germany, number six in Canada and number three (number five on re-entry in 1985) in Ireland.

The song is most associated with the July 1985 Live Aid event, where it was performed by Benjamin Orr during the Philadelphia event; the song was also used as the background music to a montage of clips depicting the contemporaneous Ethiopian famine during the London event, which was introduced by English musician David Bowie. Following the concert, it re-entered the UK Singles Chart and peaked at number four in August 1985. Proceeds from the sales of the re-released song raised nearly £160,000 for the Band Aid Trust; Ocasek presented the charity's trustee Midge Ure with a cheque for the amount while he was in London in November 1986 promoting his solo album This Side of Paradise.

In a retrospective review of the single, AllMusic journalist Donald A. Guarisco praised the song for being "a gorgeous ballad that matches heartfelt songwriting to an alluring electronic soundscape. The music reflects the lyrical tone with a lovely melody that rises and falls in a soothing yet sad fashion."

Music video
The music video was directed by actor Timothy Hutton and features then-19-year-old model and actress Paulina Porizkova, who would later become Ric Ocasek's third wife.

The video alternates between shots of Orr sitting in a disused nightclub, facing mannequins posed at the bar as customers and bartender, and scenes that depict the breakdown of a relationship between the characters played by Ocasek and Porizkova. Ultimately left alone, the woman cries and laughs hysterically for a time before visiting the nightclub. She looks sadly in through a dirty window at the stage, where tuxedo-clad mannequins of the band members are posed with their instruments as if playing a show, and turns to walk away as the video ends.

Hutton later recalled that his directing the video came about because he was living next to Elliot Roberts, the manager of the Cars. They were listening to tracks from the then-unreleased album Heartbeat City and Hutton told Roberts he was particularly impressed by "Drive".
At that time, everybody was making videos. It was the height of MTV, and when you made a record, you were also thinking about the video. I talked to Elliott about how much I liked that song "Drive," and I started describing all the different ways I thought they could go with it, as far as the video. And he said, "You know, everything you're saying sounds really interesting. Do you mind if… Would you be up for me passing that concept along to Ric Ocasek?" I said, "Sure!" So he got back to me the next day and said, "Ric and I think you should direct the video. We love your idea, your take on it." So that's how that happened. And about a month later, I was in New York at the Astoria Studios over two days, filming the video.

Hutton and Ric Ocasek became friends, which led to Ocasek being cast in the 1987 film Made in Heaven.

Track listings
7-inch single
A. "Drive" – 3:55
B. "Stranger Eyes" – 4:26

12-inch single
A. "Drive" – 3:55
B1. "My Best Friend's Girl" – 3:44
B2. "Stranger Eyes" – 4:26

Charts

Weekly charts

Year-end charts

Certifications

See also
 List of number-one adult contemporary singles of 1984 (U.S.)

References

1983 songs
1984 singles
The Cars songs
Elektra Records singles
Song recordings produced by Ric Ocasek
Song recordings produced by Robert John "Mutt" Lange
Songs about cars
Songs written by Ric Ocasek
Synth rock songs
Rock ballads
1980s ballads